Pauline Parmentier was the defending champion, but she was defeated in the second round by Magdaléna Rybáriková.

Andrea Petkovic won in the final, 6–2, 6–3, against Ioana Raluca Olaru.

Seeds

Draw

Finals

Top half

Bottom half

References

External links
Main Draw
Qualifying Draw

Gastein Ladies - Singles
Gastein Ladies
Gast
Gast